Besim Dina (born 6 July 1971) is an Albanian comedian, actor, writer, producer and television host. He is the host and executive producer of "Oxygen Show" for more than 7 years.

References

1971 births
Living people
Writers from Gjakova
Albanian television presenters